Francesco D'Afflitto (died 11 October 1593) was a Roman Catholic prelate who served as Bishop of Scala (1583–1593). He descends from the princely house d’Afflitto.

Biography
On 27 June 1583, Francesco D'Afflitto was appointed during the papacy of Pope Gregory XIII as Bishop of Scala. 
On 13 November 1583, he was consecrated bishop by Giulio Rossino, Archbishop of Amalfi, with Giovanni Bernardino Grandopoli, Bishop of Lettere-Gragnano, and Giovanni Agostino Campanile, Bishop of Minori, serving as co-consecrators. 
He served as Bishop of Scala until his death on 11 October 1593.

See also 
Catholic Church in Italy

References

External links and additional sources
 (for Chronology of Bishops) 
 (for Chronology of Bishops) 

16th-century Italian Roman Catholic bishops
Bishops appointed by Pope Gregory XIII
1593 deaths